The 1799 State of the Union Address was given to the United States Congress, on Tuesday, December 3, 1799, by the second president of the United States, John Adams.  He said, "the return of health, industry, and trade to those cities which have lately been afflicted with disease, and the various and inestimable advantages, civil and religious, which, secured under our happy frame of government, are continued to us unimpaired, demand of the whole American people sincere thanks to a benevolent Deity for the merciful dispensations of His providence."  It was the last address to be given at Congress Hall, Philadelphia.

References

External links 

 Corpus of Political Speeches, publicly accessible with speeches from United States, Hong Kong, Taiwan, and China, provided by Hong Kong Baptist University Library

State of the Union addresses
Speeches by John Adams
State of the Union Address
Presidency of John Adams
6th United States Congress
State of the Union Address
State of the Union Address
State of the Union